A total lunar eclipse will take place on May 26, 2040. The northern limb of the moon will pass through the center of the Earth's shadow. This is the second central lunar eclipse of Saros series 131.

Visibility
It will be completely visible over Australia and the Pacific, seen rising over Eastern Asia, and setting over North and South America.

Related lunar eclipses

Lunar year series (354 days)
This eclipse is the third of four lunar year eclipses occurring at the moon's ascending node.

The lunar year series repeats after 12 lunations or 354 days (Shifting back about 10 days in sequential years). Because of the date shift, the Earth's shadow will be about 11 degrees west in sequential events.

Metonic series
First eclipse: May 26, 2002.
Second eclipse: May 26, 2021.
Third eclipse: May 26, 2040.
Fourth eclipse: May 27, 2059.

Half-Saros cycle
A lunar eclipse will be preceded and followed by solar eclipses by 9 years and 5.5 days (a half saros). This lunar eclipse is related to two annular solar eclipses of Solar Saros 138.

Saros series

Inex series

See also
List of lunar eclipses and List of 21st-century lunar eclipses

Notes

External links
NASA: Lunar Eclipses: Past and Future

Index to Five Millennium Catalog of Lunar Eclipses, -1999 to +3000 (2000 BCE to 3000 CE)
Eclipses: 2001 to 2100

References
Bao-Lin Liu, Canon of Lunar Eclipses 1500 B.C.-A.D. 3000, 1992

2040-05
2040-05
2040-05
2040 in science